Country Code: +505
International Call Prefix: 00

National Significant Number (NSN): eight digits.

Format: +505 XXXX XXXX

The Republic of Nicaragua has a closed numbering plan of eight digits.

The change from seven to eight digits occurred in 2009, by adding
digit 2 (two) before the existing National Significant Number (NSN) for fixed services,
digit 8 (eight) before the existing National Significant Number (NSN) for mobile services.
digit 7 (seven) before the existing National Significant Number (NSN) for mobile services.
digit 5 (five) before the existing National Significant Number (NSN) for mobile services.
digit 8 (eight) after the existing National Significant Number (NSN) for mobile services; Example: +505 22222222

See also 
 Telecommunications in Nicaragua

References

Nicaragua
Communications in Nicaragua